Bondi Rescue is an Australian factual television program broadcast on Network 10 between 2006-2021. After a hiatus due to COVID and poor weather conditions the series resumed filming in the summer of 2022/2023. Season 17 will screen on Network Ten in 2023. The program follows the daily lives and routines of the Waverley Council professional lifeguards who patrol Bondi Beach.

Bondi Rescue was first broadcast in 2006. A spin-off, set in Bali, Indonesia, also screened in 2008. Bondi Rescue is broadcast internationally and has a substantial online presence. The show was created and produced by part-time lifeguard Ben Davies in collaboration with Producer Michael Cordell. It is narrated by Osher Günsberg.

On 12 October 2022, it was officially announced on the Bondi Rescue social media sites that the show will return for season 17 in 2023.

Overview
The Bondi lifeguards perform around five thousand rescues over the summer period. They also deal with other incidents including lost children, shark scares, bluebottle stings, injuries, sexual deviants, drunk beach goers and thieves on the beach. Every once in a while, celebrities also make appearances on their shores. These have included actors/comedians David Hasselhoff and Kelly Slater (stars of the fictional US lifeguards show Baywatch), Hugh Grant, Zac Efron, Rowan Atkinson, Paris Hilton, Russell Crowe, entrepreneur Richard Branson, American comedian Conan O'Brien (whose appearance was also broadcast in his own show, Conan), musician Snoop Dogg, Steve Irwin and daughter Bindi and the Indian Cricket Team. Bondi veterinarian Chris Brown repeatedly appeared on Bondi beach, meeting lifeguards, in his own show Bondi Vet.

Bondi also has its Annual Lifeguard Ironman Challenge, which tests the skills of each lifeguard which typically consists of a one-kilometre run from Bondi to local beach Tamarama, then a one-kilometre swim to nearby Bronte Beach, followed by a two-kilometre board-paddle back to Bondi. The race is handicapped: the more accomplished swimmers and board-paddlers set off from Bondi later (up to twelve minutes, depending on how many competitors there are).

Footage for the show is shot during the preceding Australian summer (usually between December and February), with certain episodes reflecting incidents that have occurred during Christmas Day, New Year's Day and Australia Day. Noteworthy incidents at nearby Tamarama and Bronte Beaches, which the lifeguards are also responsible for, are occasionally shown. Later seasons also featured footage of lifeguard trials and training exercises from the middle of the year. The training in the middle of the year is a trial to test the fitness, strength and ability of the lifeguards. It consists of an 800-metre swim in under thirteen-and-a-half minutes in a swimming pool, a 600-metre swim surf and two 600-metre runs and on the sand, a 600-metre board paddle, then a set of demanding rescues at Bondi which should be completed in under 25 minutes. It is also a test for trainee lifeguards to show they are able and committed to the role of a lifeguard. If the competitors do not complete the tasks in the time limit, they are eliminated and do not advance to the next test.

Many rescue boards and jet skis have a camera attached for close-up footage. When deemed safe to do so, the cameraman accompanies the lifeguards out to sea and has even had to assist with rescue operations on a number of occasions.

The production company pays Waverley Council an access fee to film the program on Bondi Beach. The lifeguards are paid a separate licensing fee for the use of their images in the series.

The lifeguards
Current lifeguards at Bondi beach

Alexander "Alex" Koops
Andrew "Reidy" Reid – featured
Andy Mole
Anthony "Harries" Carroll – featured 
Anthony "Glick" Glick – featured
Ben "Quiggers" Quigley – featured
Bruce "Hoppo" Hopkins (head-lifeguard) – featured and starring
Chase Hardaker (rookie)
Chris "Chappo/Chips" Chapman – featured 
Corey Oliver – featured
Daniel "Beardy" McLaughlin (also carpenter) – featured
David Skene
Dylan "Milky" Davis (trainee)
Eddy Hudson
Evan Faulks
Gavin "Bagus" Stevenson – featured
Harrison "Lionel" Reid – featured
Jack Curtis - featured
Jackson Doolan – featured
Jake Bracken
Jake Nolan – Featured
Joel "Loaf" Bevilacqua – featured
Joel Bolewski – featured
Josh "dabigman" Burke
Juliana "Jules" King
Kailan "KC" Collins (former ironman) – featured
Lachlan MacIntosh
Lachlan "Lachie" McArthur
Liam "Itchy" Taylor
Lukas "Boo" Street-Wong
Luke Faddy
Matthew "Matt H." Hastie
Mario Marfella – featured
Max Ayshford – featured
Max MacGuigan
Max Milligan – featured
Noah "Mort" Finnimore (trainee) – featured 
Quinn "Quinno" Darragh (part-time – also paramedic)
Ryan "Whippet" Clark (former child soap actor) – featured
Ryan Yerbury – featured (also police officer)
Sam Fleeting
TJ Hendy (also Ironman)
Thomas "Egg/Tommy" Bunting (also chiropractor)
Trent "Maxi" Maxwell – Featured (also firefighter) 
Trent "Singlets" Falson – featured (also personal fitness trainer)
Troy "Gonzo" Quinlan – featured
Tyson McIntosh – featured
Wally Eggleton – featured
William "Will/Rhino" Bigelow (former football player)

Former
Aaron "Azza"/"Azza B" Buchan
Aaron "Azza"/"Azza G" Graham (team leader)
Adrian "Taco" Kovacic
Adriel "Bacon" Young
Andrew "Pine" O'Sullivan
Beau Day
Ben "Benny" Davies (producer/surfer)
Ben Sutherland
Blake McKeown
Brad "Mal" Malyon
Brooke Cassell
Bobby "Yak" Yaldwyn (also paramedic)
Chris Emery
Chris "Thaney" Thane
Clint "Klipper" Kimmins (also triathlete) 
Colin Thackeray
Cooper "Coops" Braxton
Cooper "Coops" Wilson
Corey Adams
Craig Carney
Danny McKell
Dean "Deano" Gladstone
Derek Recio
Des "The Chairman" Burke
Dunstan "Dunno" Foss
Greg "Bisho" Bishop (also firefighter)
Harry "H"/"H-man" Nightingale (retired in 2015)
Jesse "Kid" Polock
Jethro "Jeff" James 
John "Johnny" Robson
Kobi Graham
Kristian "Yatesy" Yates
Kyle Pao (exchange lifeguard from Hawaii)
Luke "Louie" Daniels
Matt "Burkey" Burke
Matt Colquhoun
Matt Dee
Michael "Mouse"/"Black Cloud"/"Mick" Jenkinson 
Nathan "Anny" Anson
Nicola Atherton (former pro surfer, current surf instructor)
Rod "Kerrbox"/"Box" Kerr (team leader, former surf champion)
Sean Carroll
Scotty Thomson
Stuart Morrow
Steve Vincent (The Don)
Terry "Tezz" McDermott (died in 2022)
Temika Wright (exchange trainee)
Tommy Frazer
Tom Miller

Vehicles
 Yamaha Rhino 700, ATV
 Yamaha WaveRunner FX High Output, PWC
 Kracka and Bennet surf rescue board

Bondi Rescue: Bali

A nine-part spin-off series, entitled Bondi Rescue: Bali and set in Bali, Indonesia, premiered on 10 September 2008. The spin-off followed two months delegations of the Bondi lifeguards (including Dean 'Deano' Gladstone, Andrew 'Reidy' Reid, Ryan 'Whippet' Clark, Chris 'Chappo/Chips' Chapman, Tom 'Egg' Bunting, Matt 'Matty' Dee, Aaron 'Azza' and Kobi Graham and mission chief Terry 'Tezz' McDermott) as they were assigned to a two-month stint at Kuta Beach, dealing with the more humid climate, a much larger beach, an exceptionally strong surf and the absence of the rescue equipment they had back home (even in ambulances), making it the world's most deadly guarded beach: twelve fatalities in an average year. They join the hundred strong local life guards, supervised by popular singer Marcello Arayafaya, in an official international exchange program.

The spin-off failed to score ratings, and was cancelled after four episodes. However the whole series was aired and repeated overseas, notably in Flanders.

Reception

Bondi Rescue has proven to be successful for Network 10, averaging 1.31 million viewers during its third season. It won the Logie Awards Most Popular Factual Program in 2008, 2009, 2010, 2011 and 2012 and also a nomination for the Most Outstanding Factual Series at the 2010 and 2011 ceremonies. Its success also led to similar series such as the Seven Network's Surf Patrol and Nine's Deadly Surf being commissioned.

Logie Awards

Books
The first book written about Bondi Rescue was by Nick Carroll and published on 1 November 2009. It was titled Out the Back with Bondi Rescue: True Stories Behind the Hit TV Show and was about the Bondi lifeguards and took readers 'behind-the-scenes' and showed their 'journeys and the effect this has had on their lives'.

A second book, titled Stories From the Bondi Lifeguards, was published on 1 February 2015 and showed a 'behind-the-scenes' look and memorable stories from the lifeguards on Bondi Rescue. The book was written by a some of the lifeguards who frequented the show.

Trent Maxwell, commonly known as Maxi, published a series of children's books in 2018 about his lifeguarding experiences.

Mobile game

A game based on the show was developed for iPhone and iPad. In the game, the player is a lifeguard who must keep the swimmers between the flags and protect them from hazards.

Series overview

See also

Waverley Council – Lifeguard History Project and photos
 Carroll, Nick (2009). Out The Back With Bondi Rescue: True Stories Behind the Hit TV Show. Allen & Unwin.

References

External links

 Production website

Australian factual television series
Network 10 original programming
Television shows set in Sydney
2006 Australian television series debuts
2000s Australian documentary television series
2010s Australian documentary television series
2020s Australian documentary television series
English-language television shows
Surf lifesaving
Lifesaving in Australia
Bondi, New South Wales